Lost Creek State Park is a  public recreation area in Deer Lodge County, Montana, United States, about  north of Anaconda.

Description
A short walking trail leads to Lost Creek Falls, which plunge . The park offers seasonal camping, fishing, picnicking, bicycling, hiking and wildlife viewing with mountain goats and bighorn sheep commonly seen.

See also

 List of Montana state parks

References

External links

 
 Lost Creek State Park Trail Map Montana Fish, Wildlife & Parks

State parks of Montana
Protected areas of Deer Lodge County, Montana
Protected areas established in 1957
1957 establishments in Montana